Thomas William Lyons (September 26, 1923 – March 25, 1988) was a bishop of the Catholic Church in the United States. He served as an auxiliary bishop of the Archdiocese of Washington from 1974 to 1988.

Lyons is listed by the Archdiocese of Washington as being credibly accused of sexually molesting a minor.

Biography

Early life 
Thomas Lyons was born on September 26, 1923, in Washington, D.C. He attended graduated from St. Charles College High School in Catonsville, Maryland.

Priesthood 
Lyons was ordained a priest by Cardinal Patrick Aloysius O’Boyle for the Archdiocese of Washington on May 22, 1948.  After his ordination, Lyons served  as an assistant pastor at St. John the Evangelist Parish in Silver Spring, Maryland.  He was then appointed as an assistant pastor at the cathedral parish. In 1953, Lyons was appointed director of Mackin High School in Washington, serving there until 1957.

Lyons was named director of education for the archdiocesan schools in 1964, holding that post until his appointment as bishop. During this time, he also held pastoral assignments at St. Patrick's, Annunciation and St. Francis DeSales parishes in Washington.  He frequently made surprise visits to Catholic schools in the archdiocese, storing a basketball in the trunk of his car for pickup games.

Auxiliary Bishop of Washington 
On July 12, 1974 Pope Paul VI appointed Lyons as the titular bishop of Murthlacum and as an auxiliary bishop of the Archdiocese of Washington. He was consecrated by Archbishop William Baum on September 12, 1974. The principal co-consecrators were Auxiliary Bishop Harold Robert Perry  and Bishop Edward Herrmann.

Death and legacy 
In April 1983, Lyons was severely injured in an automobile accident and required a blood transfusion.  He died of hepatitis received from the transfusion at St. Agnese Hospital in Baltimore, Maryland, on March 25, 1988.

Lyons was included on a list of priests credibly accused of Sexual Abuse released by the Archdioceses of Washington on October 15, 2018.  His abuse was reported to the archdiocese in 2002.

References

1923 births
1988 deaths
People from Washington, D.C.
Roman Catholic Archdiocese of Washington
20th-century American Roman Catholic titular bishops
American Roman Catholic clergy of Irish descent
Roman Catholic bishops in Washington, D.C.